Based in Baltimore, Maryland, four ensembles comprise the GBYO, the full-sized symphonic Youth Orchestra, the intermediate-level Concert Orchestra, and the beginning-level Sinfonia and Sinfonietta ensembles.  GBYO also offers a "Bridges" program, providing entry-level instruction to underserved youth in the city. The GBYO ensembles are in residence at Loyola College in Maryland.

Ensembles

GBYO Youth Orchestra (Ken Lam, Conductor)

GBYO Concert Orchestra (Mary Poling, Conductor) 

The Greater Baltimore Youth Concert Strings was formed in 1999.

Sinfonietta and Sinfonia (Michael Gamon, Conductor) 

In order to accommodate students who are at an early stage in the study of stringed instruments, the Greater Baltimore Youth Orchestras added the Sinfonia in the Fall of 2005.  The Sinfonietta was created a year later to create more capacity and to accommodate a wider range of young musicians.

Members of the Sinfonia and the Sinfonietta are primarily elementary and middle school-aged students who are playing literature through the first four Suzuki books.

GBYO "Bridges" Program 
In addition to the orchestras, GBYO offers music instruction to Baltimore city students through the "Bridges" program.

Bridges classes are currently held in eight Baltimore city schools. After students complete the two- to three-year Bridges program, they are assisted in finding continuing instruction, invited to join the entry level orchestras, and are loaned an instrument for use as long as they continue to participate in the orchestra of the GBYO.

Staff and Conductors

Ken Lam - Music Director & Conductor, GBYO Youth Orchestra 

Mr. Lam was a featured conductor in the League of American Orchestra's 2009 Bruno Walter National Conductors Preview with the Nashville Symphony and made his US professional debut with the National Symphony Orchestra at the Kennedy Center in June 2008 as one of four conductors selected by Leonard Slatkin. Last season he gave concerts with the Hong Kong Philharmonic, the Hong Kong Sinfonietta, and the Taipei Symphony Orchestra. He was principal conductor of the Hong Kong Chamber Orchestra from 2001 to 2007.

In opera, he regularly directs productions of the Janiec Opera Company at Brevard and was assistant conductor at both Cincinnati Opera and Baltimore Lyric Opera. He has also been assistant conductor to Lorin Maazel at the Castleton Festival for two seasons.

Active in choral music, Mr. Lam has been artistic director of Hong Kong Voices since 2000 and directed the choral program at the University of Hong Kong for three years before moving to the US in 2005.

As resident conductor of Brevard Music Center, he works with all of their orchestras and collaborates with faculty and students of the composition department regularly.

His conducting teachers are Gustav Meier, Markand Thakar, Marin Alsop, and Edward Polochick at Peabody Conservatory. He studied with David Zinman and Murry Sidlin at the American Academy of Conducting at Aspen for three summers and was nominated for the Aspen / Glimmerglass Opera Prize. He was also a two-time fellow at the National Conducting Institute studying with Leonard Slatkin.

He read economics at St. John's College, Cambridge University and was a practicing solicitor specializing in asset finance for ten years with the international law firm Clifford Chance. He was a director and manager at the classical label Naxos.

He is also a keen golfer and tennis player and was a past president of the Cambridge University Chinese Society.

Mary Poling - Conductor, GBYO Concert Orchestra 
MaryAnn Fasold Poling earned B.S. degrees in both Music Education and Fine Arts from Indiana University of Pennsylvania, where she held the principal chair in all major ensembles and won the Frank Gorell competition. Attending the Peabody Institute of Music on a full scholarship, and playing principal in all graduate ensembles, she earned an M.M. in Oboe Performance under the tutelage of Sara Watkins, with whom she also pursued doctoral studies until Ms. Watkins’ untimely death in 1997. Mary performed in the American Waterways Wind Orchestra and in both the American and Italian Spoleto festivals; she has performed professionally in fifteen different countries. Locally she has performed with the Annapolis Symphony Orchestra, the Annapolis Opera, the Baltimore Chamber Orchestra, the Frederick Symphony, the Maryland Lyric Opera and the Melos Sinfonia.

Mary has served since 2000 as the conductor of the intermediate orchestra for the Greater Baltimore Youth Orchestra Association, which she joined after teaching for nine years in the Harford County Public Schools.  In 2010 she began conducting an intermediate orchestra for the Maryland Classic Youth Orchestras in Montgomery County, Md., and in 2011 joined the faculty of the McDaniel Orchestra Camp.  Mary has a substantial private studio, teaches oboe at Goucher College, and performs as a freelance musician in the Baltimore-Washington area.  She also leads the music ministry at New Hope Community Church in Pikesville.  Mary lives outside of Baltimore with her husband and two young daughters, both of whom are aspiring musicians—one on the oboe, the other on the harp.

Michael Gamon - Conductor, Sinfonia & Sinfonietta 
Michael is a Principal Researcher at microsoft, researching areas like: Artificial intelligence,  Human language technologies, Human-computer interaction and Social sciences.

Hana Morford - Education Director, GBYO Bridges Program 
A passionate educator, violist Hana Morford has taught in the GBYO Bridges program for the past two years, and is also a faculty member in the Baltimore Symphony's OrchKids program, the Baltimore School for the Art's TWIGS program, and at the Peabody Preparatory.

Ms. Morford has been a finalist with the San Antonio and New World (Miami) Symphonies and plays frequently with the Baltimore Chamber Orchestra.  Hana has also been a fellowship student at numerous music festivals throughout the US, including the Spoleto USA, Kneisel Hall, Aspen, and Sarasota Music Festivals.  She has performed chamber music with artists including Keng-Yuen Tseng, Alan Stepansky, and Victoria Chiang.

Hana received her BM from the Cleveland Institute of Music, her MM from Rice University, and a Graduate Performance Diploma from the Peabody Conservatory.  Hana's former teachers include Victoria Chiang, James Dunham, Jeffrey Irvine, Lynne Ramsey, and Rebecca Henry.  While a student at Peabody, Ms. Morford was the recipient of both a Peabody Career Grant and the Israel Dorman Memorial Award in Strings.

Frances Belcher - Executive Director 

Frances brings a lifelong commitment to music education to the Greater Baltimore Youth Orchestras and its Bridges Program.  Before becoming the executive director in January 2011, she spent five years as Bridges Program coordinator, overseeing the implementation of the program, building relationships with partner schools, and managing the operational and educational aspects of the program.  She had previously served as executive director of the GBYO from June 2004 through August 2005, after completing two years as executive director of the Western Piedmont Symphony in Hickory, North Carolina.  Just prior to that position she was a Fellow in the League of American Orchestras’ Orchestra Management Fellowship Program, a year-long opportunity to work in some of the nation's top orchestras with experienced executive directors.  Ms. Belcher worked in Aspen at the Aspen Music Festival and School, the Indianapolis Symphony Orchestra, the Winston-Salem Symphony (North Carolina), and at the Chicago Symphony.

She has a degree in Music Education in piano performance and pedagogy from the University of Tennessee and completed some graduate study at Memphis State University (now University of Memphis) and the Peabody Conservatory.  Ms. Belcher had a studio of private and group piano students for thirty years before beginning a new career in Arts Administration, first becoming involved with the GBYO as a volunteer and board member in 1994 and moving into the position of manager in 1997 and executive director in 2000, before participating in the Fellowship Program.

Jason Love - Immediate Past Music Director & Conductor, GBYO Youth Orchestra 

Jason's twelve-year tenure as artistic director and conductor of the Greater Baltimore Youth Orchestra Association was marked by continuous growth in the success and prestige of this organization. He commissioned new works, forged partnerships with other arts organizations, extended the orchestra's community outreach programs and conducted highly successful tours of Austria, Japan, and Russia.

Jason is currently the music director for the Columbia Orchestra. 

As a conductor and cellist, Jason served for five years as music director for the New Horizons Chamber Ensemble, a contemporary music group based in Baltimore, MD. Under his leadership, the NHCE gave dozens of local and world premieres and became a unique resource for contemporary music in the area. Jason is also active as a cellist, performing frequently in Maryland and across the United States. He recently gave the NC premiere of Tan Dun's multi-media cello concerto, The Map.

Recent and upcoming guest appearances find him conducting a variety of ensembles such as the Baltimore Symphony, Washington Sinfonietta (DC), Bismarck Symphony, and RUCKUS, a contemporary music ensemble at the University of Maryland, Baltimore County where he also teaches conducting. Aside from classical music he performs with singer-songwriter Angela Taylor and can be heard on singer-songwriter Sahffi's upcoming album Turning Tides.

Born in Burlington, North Carolina, Jason studied violoncello with Ronald Thomas and conducting with Frederik Prausnitz at the Peabody Conservatory. He is past president of the Peabody Alumni Association.

GBYO Board of Directors 

Current GBYO Board members

President: Jeffrey Zoller

Vice President: Rosemarie Paull

Secretary: James Galvin

Treasurer: Peggy Fong Lu

Historian: Gina Kotowski

Kathryn Kotz

Karen Lane

Peg Mitchell

Diana Parsons

Chris Swekel

GBYO in the Press 
To be updated

Concerts and Events 
No current events listed

See also
 List of symphony orchestras

References

American youth orchestras
Musical groups established in 1977
Musical groups from Baltimore
1977 establishments in Maryland
Youth organizations based in Maryland
Organizations based in Baltimore
Orchestras based in Maryland